KKJQ (97.3 FM, "Q97") is a radio station broadcasting a country music format. Its city of license is Garden City, Kansas, United States. The station is currently owned by Mark Yearout, through licensee Southwind Broadcasting, LLC, and features programming from ABC Radio  and Premiere Radio Networks.

History
The station went on the air as KBUF-FM on 1 February 1980. On 23 July 1984, the station changed its call sign to the current KKJQ. National Association of Farm Broadcasters honoree Loretta P. "Lory Williams" Johnson served as the farm broadcaster at KKJQ from 1986 until her death in 2021.

References

External links

KJQ
Country radio stations in the United States